Per Arne Lodding Olsen (21 February 1961 – 18 November 2022) was a Norwegian politician who served as a Member of Parliament for the Progress Party, where he held the position as second deputy leader. He served as the Governor of Vestfold from 2016 to 2019, and from 2019 until his death was the Governor of Vestfold og Telemark, elected by the King-in-Council. While Vestfold and Telemark merged on 1 January 2020, the office of the Governor was merged a year before, on 1 January 2019.

Olsen served as a deputy Member of Parliament to the Norwegian Parliament from Vestfold from 2001 to 2009. He was also the mayor of Tønsberg from 2003 until 2009, when he became a Member of Parliament.

Olsen died on 18 November 2022, at the age of 61.

References

1961 births
2022 deaths
21st-century Norwegian politicians
Deputy members of the Storting
Mayors of places in Vestfold
Politicians from Tønsberg
Progress Party (Norway) politicians